The Arunachal Pradesh Legislative Assembly election, 2004 took place in 2004 to elect 60 seats in the Arunachal Pradesh Legislative Assembly. The results were declared on 10 October 2004. The Indian National Congress won the popular vote and a majority of seats and Gegong Apang was re-elected as Chief Minister of Arunachal Pradesh.

Result

Elected Members

References

 State Assembly elections in Arunachal Pradesh
2000s in Arunachal Pradesh
2004 State Assembly elections in India